Ashley Creek is a stream in the U.S. state of Utah. It is a tributary of the Green River.

Ashley Creek has the name of William Henry Ashley (1778–1838), a frontiersman, entrepreneur, and politician. A variant name was "Ashley's Fork".

See also
List of rivers of Utah

References

Rivers of Uintah County, Utah
Rivers of Utah
Tributaries of the Green River (Colorado River tributary)
Tributaries of the Colorado River in Utah